In seven-dimensional geometry, a 7-polytope is a polytope contained by 6-polytope facets. Each 5-polytope ridge being shared by exactly two 6-polytope facets.

A uniform 7-polytope is one whose symmetry group is transitive on vertices and whose facets are uniform 6-polytopes.

Regular 7-polytopes 

Regular 7-polytopes are represented by the Schläfli symbol {p,q,r,s,t,u} with u {p,q,r,s,t} 6-polytopes facets around each 4-face.

There are exactly three such convex regular 7-polytopes:
 {3,3,3,3,3,3} - 7-simplex
 {4,3,3,3,3,3} - 7-cube
 {3,3,3,3,3,4} - 7-orthoplex

There are no nonconvex regular 7-polytopes.

Characteristics 

The topology of any given 7-polytope is defined by its Betti numbers and torsion coefficients.

The value of the Euler characteristic used to characterise polyhedra does not generalize usefully to higher dimensions, whatever their underlying topology. This inadequacy of the Euler characteristic to reliably distinguish between different topologies in higher dimensions led to the discovery of the more sophisticated Betti numbers.

Similarly, the notion of orientability of a polyhedron is insufficient to characterise the surface twistings of toroidal polytopes, and this led to the use of torsion coefficients.

Uniform 7-polytopes by fundamental Coxeter groups 

Uniform 7-polytopes with reflective symmetry can be generated by these four Coxeter groups, represented by permutations of rings of the Coxeter-Dynkin diagrams:

The A7 family 

The A7 family has symmetry of order 40320 (8 factorial).

There are 71 (64+8-1) forms based on all permutations of the Coxeter-Dynkin diagrams with one or more rings. All 71 are enumerated below. Norman Johnson's truncation names are given. Bowers names and acronym are also given for cross-referencing.

See also a list of A7 polytopes for symmetric Coxeter plane graphs of these polytopes.

The B7 family 

The B7 family has symmetry of order 645120 (7 factorial x 27).

There are 127 forms based on all permutations of the Coxeter-Dynkin diagrams with one or more rings. Johnson and Bowers names.

See also a list of B7 polytopes for symmetric Coxeter plane graphs of these polytopes.

The D7 family 

The D7 family has symmetry of order 322560 (7 factorial x 26).

This family has 3×32−1=95 Wythoffian uniform polytopes, generated by marking one or more nodes of the D7 Coxeter-Dynkin diagram. Of these, 63 (2×32−1) are repeated from the B7 family and 32 are unique to this family, listed below. Bowers names and acronym are given for cross-referencing.

See also list of D7 polytopes for Coxeter plane graphs of these polytopes.

The E7 family 

The E7 Coxeter group has order 2,903,040.

There are 127 forms based on all permutations of the Coxeter-Dynkin diagrams with one or more rings.

See also a list of E7 polytopes for symmetric Coxeter plane graphs of these polytopes.

Regular and uniform honeycombs 

There are five fundamental affine Coxeter groups and sixteen prismatic groups that generate regular and uniform tessellations in 6-space:

Regular and uniform tessellations include:
 , 17 forms
 Uniform 6-simplex honeycomb: {3[7]} 
 Uniform Cyclotruncated 6-simplex honeycomb: t0,1{3[7]} 
 Uniform Omnitruncated 6-simplex honeycomb: t0,1,2,3,4,5,6,7{3[7]} 
 , [4,34,4], 71 forms
 Regular 6-cube honeycomb, represented by symbols {4,34,4}, 
 Uniform 6-demicube honeycomb, represented by symbols h{4,34,4} = {31,1,33,4},  = 
Coxeter calls the first one a quarter 6-cubic honeycomb.
  =  
  =  
  =  
  =  
  =  
  =  
 : [32,2,2], 39 forms
 Uniform 222 honeycomb: represented by symbols {3,3,32,2}, 
 Uniform t4(222) honeycomb: 4r{3,3,32,2}, 
 Uniform 0222 honeycomb: {32,2,2}, 
 Uniform t2(0222) honeycomb: 2r{32,2,2},

Regular and uniform hyperbolic honeycombs 

There are no compact hyperbolic Coxeter groups of rank 7, groups that can generate honeycombs with all finite facets, and a finite vertex figure. However, there are 3 paracompact hyperbolic Coxeter groups of rank 7, each generating uniform honeycombs in 6-space as permutations of rings of the Coxeter diagrams.

Notes on the Wythoff construction for the uniform 7-polytopes 

The reflective 7-dimensional uniform polytopes are constructed through a Wythoff construction process, and represented by a Coxeter-Dynkin diagram, where each node represents a mirror.  An active mirror is represented by a ringed node.  Each combination of active mirrors generates a unique uniform polytope. Uniform polytopes are named in relation to the regular polytopes in each family. Some families have two regular constructors and thus may be named in two equally valid ways.

Here are the primary operators available for constructing and naming the uniform 7-polytopes.

The prismatic forms and bifurcating graphs can use the same truncation indexing notation, but require an explicit numbering system on the nodes for clarity.

References 

 T. Gosset: On the Regular and Semi-Regular Figures in Space of n Dimensions, Messenger of Mathematics, Macmillan, 1900
 A. Boole Stott: Geometrical deduction of semiregular from regular polytopes and space fillings, Verhandelingen of the Koninklijke academy van Wetenschappen width unit Amsterdam, Eerste Sectie 11,1, Amsterdam, 1910
 H.S.M. Coxeter:
 H.S.M. Coxeter, M.S. Longuet-Higgins und J.C.P. Miller: Uniform Polyhedra, Philosophical Transactions of the Royal Society of London, Londne, 1954
 H.S.M. Coxeter, Regular Polytopes, 3rd Edition, Dover New York, 1973
 Kaleidoscopes: Selected Writings of H.S.M. Coxeter, edited by F. Arthur Sherk, Peter McMullen, Anthony C. Thompson, Asia Ivic Weiss, Wiley-Interscience Publication, 1995,  http://www.wiley.com/WileyCDA/WileyTitle/productCd-0471010030.html
 (Paper 22) H.S.M. Coxeter, Regular and Semi Regular Polytopes I, [Math. Zeit. 46 (1940) 380-407, MR 2,10]
 (Paper 23) H.S.M. Coxeter, Regular and Semi-Regular Polytopes II, [Math. Zeit. 188 (1985) 559-591]
 (Paper 24) H.S.M. Coxeter, Regular and Semi-Regular Polytopes III, [Math. Zeit. 200 (1988) 3-45]
 N.W. Johnson: The Theory of Uniform Polytopes and Honeycombs, Ph.D. Dissertation, University of Toronto, 1966

External links 
 Polytope names
 Polytopes of Various Dimensions
 Multi-dimensional Glossary

7-polytopes